Mental illnesses, also known as psychiatric disorders, are often inaccurately portrayed in the media. Films, television programs, books, magazines, and news programs often stereotype the mentally ill as being violent or unpredictable, unlike the great majority of the actual mentally ill. As a result, some of the public stigmatize the mentally ill and believe that the mentally ill should be shunned, locked away in mental institutions, heavily medicated, or a combination of the three. However, not only are most of those with psychiatric disorders able to function adequately in society, but many are able to work successfully and make substantial contributions to society.

News
Heather Stuart published an article "Media Portrayal of Mental Illness and its Treatments" in 2006, discussing the image of mental illness is largely negative and they are often labeled as violent and criminal. Researchers have pointed out that mental illness are marginalized and silent, unable to claim their rights, and need the public and media to advocate for them. The general public has little access to psychiatric patients, and their information about psychiatric patients is largely obtained from the mass media, with limited knowledge gained through their own experiences, as confirmed by numerous surveys. Since the public's knowledge about psychiatric patients is mainly obtained through the mass media, it is feared that stereotypes in the media may in turn reinforce the public's rejection of psychiatric patients. Therefore, negative media representations have become the focus of scholarly attention.

On the one hand, researchers focus on the negative media representations because they believe that excessive negative media representations are detrimental to the treatment and rehabilitation of mentally ill patients, and they believe that the protection of human rights of mentally ill patients and the care of vulnerable groups are also important. They believe that people with mental illness are no different from other patients and should not be treated differently, nor should they be socially ostracized and treated unfairly because of their illness. They also believe that negative media representations can be changed and that effective media criticism and intervention can also improve the media's attitude toward people with mental illness. Scholars have argued that commercialized media can distort the image of people with mental illness by using content about them as a selling point, thereby reinforcing public rejection.

In 2012, India Knight wrote a column in The Sunday Times of London about depression. In response, Alastair Campbell, a columnist at The Huffington Post, described his distress at her writing that "'everybody gets depressed'" and that "there is no stigma in depression".

Campbell discussed the inappropriateness of India Knight's word choices. In writing that everyone gets depressed, he commented, she showed that she was part of that world that does not believe that clinical depression is a disease.  Campbell claimed that Knight's article reinforced the reality that there is still stigma and taboo surrounding depression. He noted that even in the medical profession, people are afraid to mention to their employers that they have depression, because they would not be fully understood as they would be if they suffered from a "physical illness".  Campbell wrote of the struggle to bring understanding to mental illness, and described Knight's article as "unhelpful, potentially damaging and certainly show[ing that] we still have quite a way to go."

People with schizophrenia are often portrayed as dangerous, violent, and as criminals despite the fact that the vast majority of them are not.

Celebrity suicides 
An abundance of media and news coverage occurs follow the celebrity suicides, such as the pretty recent deaths of Kate Spade and Robin Williams. A Columbia University study revealed that "suicides rose nearly 10% higher than expected in the months following Robin Williams' death in August 2014", especially involving the method used by Robin Williams himself (a 32% increase).

These results support the idea of suicide contagion, which the U.S. Department of Health & Human Services (HHS) defines as "the exposure to suicide or suicidal behaviors within one's family, one's peer group, or through media reports of suicide and can result in an increase in suicide and suicidal behaviors."

Movies

 Sideways gives an accurate depiction of depression. One of the movie's main characters, Miles Raymond, is shown to exhibit several signs of depression, some of which include using substances (alcohol) in an attempt to cope with the failures and losses in his life, not having hope for his future, and having a consistently depressed mood.
 Julien Donkey Boy gives an accurate depiction of schizophrenia. The movie features a man named Julien who exhibits several signs of schizophrenia. One of said signs includes having conversations with people who, in reality, are not actually there.

Influence of movies on the public regarding mental illness representation 
As a media component responsible for shaping the public’s perceptions, a previous study states that movies appear to provide significant implications in identifying the presence of mental illness in different social situations. Since many studies demonstrate different viewpoints on whether media influences in defining mental illness positively or negatively, the role of the movie is also one of the components that cannot be neglected.

Positive cases 
The research regarding the educational aspects of the film towards nurse students from all fields suggested that the films of different genres, including life stories, adventures, and others, provided practical insights in understanding the patient experience and perspectives in different environments.

Another research also found the positive aspects of the movies for educational purposes on students in medical (clinical) fields. The films appear to provide valuable lessons for the individuals in understanding the specific cases and appropriate treatment plans for patients. Even though there are some concerns that movies are not intended for educational purposes but for entertainment, researchers suggest that films provide positive outcomes in students’ learning experiences. Regarding the positive roles of the film in education, a case study analyzing the students in medical fields and found that the appropriate use of movies can provide helpful ideas in applying practical skills related to the medical fields, such as medical ethics, doctor-patient relationship, and mental illness, etc.

Negative cases 
However, there are concerning voices regarding the role of movies in shaping the younger individual’s perceptions in defining mental illness. The past research regarding the film “One Flew Over the Cuckoo’s Nest (1975)” with conducting college students found that the portrayal of mental illness can negatively influence the individual’s attitudes regarding individuals with mental illness, psychiatric institutions, etc.

In a previous research study, the researchers found that the representation of the “outcast” character with mental illness in a movie tends to get negative evaluations from the children. Regarding this, the study found that it could make the children stick with the significant levels of stigmatization in negatively labeling the individuals with the mental illness even when they grow up.

Other research specifically focuses on a particular film, Joker, found that the depiction of individuals with mental illness appears to be negative towards the audience. Regarding this, the researchers demonstrated the concerns that the film Joker can aggravate the self-stigma of individuals with mental illness with the emphasis on negative depictions.

Modern perceptions regarding the movie portrayal of mental illness 
The portrayal of mental illness in media, including film and television shows, is presented in various forms since the advancement in technology occurs over time with easier access. The media expert suggests the public needs to become more open to learning about mental illness by understanding significant components presented in media platforms, including film and television entertainment.

The journal article concerning depictions of the media on mental illness also emphasizes the importance of  having broader perceptions in understanding different experiences of others in addressing crucial topics related to mental illness. Since it was found that the movies are also responsible for depicting various experiences of others with mental illness, the accurate portrayal of associated characteristics is significant.

Approaches of streaming media platforms 
Since it became easier for the public to access different media forms, including movies, TV series, or other programs worldwide, the popular streaming service Netflix demonstrates different approaches to mental illness with various portrayals. Amongst the series Netflix provided, the recent study exploring the series 13 Reasons Why found that the representations of mental-health phenomena positively influence the individual’s perceptions in understanding perceived norms regarding mental health problems, such as reaching out to others for support and discussing suicide with people for prevention.

13 Reasons Why is a Netflix original with the plot surrounding a high school female, Hannah Baker, who committed suicide. Controversy around this TV show has arisen for a while ever since it was released, and many articles and postings have been uploaded online, especially around the idea of connecting the female's suicide to a form of anger and revenge. Some argue that there is too much of an emphasis on how Hannah committed suicide, including the gory visuals and details as well as the idea of revenge, and not enough focus on the true reasons behind ending one's life. Other's also emphasize how shows such as "13 Reasons Why" normally just skim over and cover only the surface of these issues, and thus somehow desensitize something as important as suicide. For example, this specific show was accused of not talking much about mental health in its first season (besides the suicide itself).

The National Alliance on Mental Health (NAMI) additionally argues that the depiction of a "planned out suicide" is damaging, as suicides are rarely planned.

Television 
Throughout the world of television mental illnesses have been showcased throughout the years within many programs; for example, the hit television show on the A&E network Hoarders, starts off with showcasing one or two individuals on their Obsessive compulsive disorder. Each individual would work with a psychologist or psychiatrist, professional organizer, or an “extreme cleaning specialist” which are individuals who specialize in treatment for this exact compulsive disorder.  Mental illness and treatments using the media as a platform stated in “Issues of Mental Health (p.593) “The role of documentary shows like Hoarders in the change of classification is unclear. However, some believe the rise in awareness caused by them was a significant contributing factor.> The article also stated that with the rise of “Hoarder” becoming a “buzzword” it began to command significant amount of professional attention.

Intervention, another program on the A&E network, also focuses on mental illness but, in this program it introduces the aspect of substance abuse. This program, like Hoarders follows the story on either one or two individuals who suffer from substance dependence and we are then taken into their day-to-day lives living with this dependence. Later the individual with the addiction is then given an ultimatum in which they decide the future of their well-being. For example, they would either go to rehabilitation or risk losing family, friends, shelter and in most cases financial assistance. The documentary style television program also brought in celebrity subjects to draw more attention to how important and powerful an intervention can affect anyone. What this show educates the viewers about was the intervention process - being introduced to the intervention process and the way to properly handle an individual with addiction. This television program also eased the stigma on therapy; but more specifically the stigma on the effectiveness of interventions.

Children's television
Children's television programs contain references to mental illnesses. A study conducted on a variety of New Zealand Children's television shows showed that a mental illness reference appeared in 59 out of 128 episodes studied. 159 mental illness references where contained in the 59 episodes. The 159 references consisted of vocabulary and character descriptions. The terms "mad", "crazy', and "losing your mind" were above the three most common vocabulary references. Character descriptions consisted of disfigured facial features (teeth, noses, etc.) as well as disfigured extremities (feet, fingers, etc.).

Social media 

Mental illness is often discussed on social media and several studies have noted a link between it and severe psychiatric disorders. Studies such as one in 1998 led by Robert E. Kraut indicated that Internet can have an impact on a person's daily life and that increased amounts of time online can have a detrimental impact on interpersonal relationships and social interactions, which can in turn lead to increased depression and alienation.

Today, social media platforms such as Twitter or Instagram have increased the amount of personal interaction with other users. There is current research that explores the role social media has in assisting people find resources and networks to support one's mental health. The interconnectivity between users through social media has encouraged many to seek help with professionals while also reducing the stigma surrounding mental illnesses. Though these claims are still being researched, there is a notable rise in communication within social media as a whole.

The Scottish Health Survey  conducted a study monitoring screen time and mental health in individuals. The research concluded that adults ages 16–99 who watch TV more than three hours a day were more likely to have poor mental health. 3 hours or more of television or screen time in children lead to a downward trend in mental health positivity. The study concluded that there is a correlation between screen time and a decline in mental health.

TikTok 
TikTok has especially become a social media platform where mental health and illnesses are talked about more freely. The National institutes of Health (NIH) released in 2015 that more than 1/3 of Americans use the internet to help "diagnose their ailments", including mental illnesses. TikTok videos promoting either self-diagnosis or possible symptoms of different illnesses has caused an increase of internet users to believe they have a disorder, when in reality they may or may not. Additionally, TikTok keeps up with the latest trends, and some trends touch upon mental health (positively or negatively, depending on the point of view). One trend, as explained by the Philadelphia Magazine, uses intermittent fasting to heal anxiety. However, some individuals, including licensed counselors such as Akua K. Boateng argue that this advice is actually very detrimental in actually promoting bad mental habits instead, including the possible development of eating disorders.

Other trends, including "What I Eat in a Day" Tiktoks, have been also labeled as harmful by health professionals, since these videos may lead viewers to habits of unhealthy comparison and goals of developing the "societal accepted body". With a majority of these videos reaching women especially, many believe that viewers may become more vulnerable, leading to unhealthy eating habits.

Tumblr 
There exists a large population of self-identified mentally ill users on Tumblr, where the ability to post more unfiltered content led to individuals arguably sensationalizing and glamorizing mental illnesses and suicide. A thesis on Tumblr poetry explains how "[t]he site serves as both a place of relief for people with mental health disorders, or even just every day growing pains, but it can also act as an enabling source for users who use the site as an echo chamber for their own problematic coping mechanisms, implying a groupthink problem that can exist in this kind of digital space." Tumblr staff attempted to prevent the use of their platform for romanticizing mental illness by changing their policies in 2012 to prohibit content actively promoting or depicting self harm and showing Public Service Announcements instead of results when users search keywords related to self-harm, such as "proana," "thinspo," "thinspiration," "purge," "bulimia," "anorexic," and more.

See also
 Mental disorders in film
 Mental illness in fiction

References 

 
Mental disorders